Pueblerina is a 1949 Mexican drama film directed by Emilio Fernández. It was entered into the 1949 Cannes Film Festival.

Cast
 Columba Domínguez - Paloma
 Roberto Cañedo - Aurelio Rodríguez
 Arturo Soto Rangel - Priest
 Manuel Dondé - Rómulo
 Ismael Pérez - Felipe
 Luis Aceves Castañeda - Ramiro González
 Guillermo Cramer - Julio González
 Enriqueta Reza - Soledad
 Rogelio Fernández - Froilán
 Agustín Fernández - Tiburcio

References

External links

1949 films
1940s Spanish-language films
1949 drama films
Mexican black-and-white films
Films directed by Emilio Fernández
Mexican drama films
1940s Mexican films